Ragtown may refer to one of the following places

Ragtown, Nevada 
Ragtown, California
Ragtown, Arkansas, Monroe County
Ragtown, Texas, Lamar County

Ragtown, West Virginia, Monongalia County